Erin is a Hiberno-English word for Ireland originating from the Irish word "Éirinn". "Éirinn" is the dative case of the Irish word for Ireland, "Éire", genitive "Éireann", the dative being used in prepositional phrases such as "go hÉirinn" "to Ireland", "in Éirinn" "in Ireland", "ó Éirinn" "from Ireland".

The dative has replaced the nominative in a few regional Irish dialects (particularly Galway-Connemara and Waterford). Poets and nineteenth-century Irish nationalists used Erin in English as a romantic name for Ireland. Often, "Erin's Isle" was used. In this context, along with Hibernia, Erin is the name given to the female personification of Ireland, but the name was rarely used as a given name, probably because no saints, queens, or literary figures were ever called Erin.

According to Irish mythology and folklore, the name was originally given to the island by the Milesians after the goddess Ériu.

The phrase Erin go bragh ("Éire go brách" in standard orthography, dative "in Éirinn go brách" "in Ireland forever"), a slogan associated with the United Irishmen Rebellion of 1798, is often translated as "Ireland forever".

Usage as a given or family name
As a given name, Erin is used for both sexes, although, given its origins, it is principally used as a feminine forename. It first became a popular given name in the United States. Its US popularity for males peaked in 1974 with 321 boys registered with the name. Erin is also a name for Ireland in Welsh, and is one of the 20 most popular girls' names in Wales. 

As a family name, Erin has been used as one of the many spellings of the name of the Scottish clan "Irwin"—which was involved in the Scottish Plantations of Ireland. However, that name was originally derived from the place of the same name near Dumfries, and means "green water", from Brittonic ir afon.

People

Females
 Erin Andrews (born 1978), American sports reporter
 Erin Anttila (born 1977), Irish-Finnish singer, better known by her mononym Erin
 Erin Babcock (1981–2020), Canadian politician
 Erin Bell (born 1987), Australian former netball player
 Erin Bethea (born 1982), American actress
 Erin Boag (born 1975), New Zealand ballroom dancer
 Erin Brockovich (born 1960), American legal clerk and environmental activist and subject of the movie of the same name
 Erin Burnett (born 1976), American news anchor and reporter
 Erin Byrnes, American politician
 Erin Calipari American pharmacologist
 Erin Davis Canadian Broadcaster and author
 Grey DeLisle (born 1973), American voice actress and recording artist, real name Erin Grey van Oosbree
 Erin Fitzgerald (born 1972) Canadian-American voice actress
 Erin Gray (born 1950), American actress
 Erin Gruwell (born 1969), American teacher
 Erin Heatherton (born 1989), American fashion model
 Erin Hunter, pseudonym used by the authors of the Warriors and Seekers series
 Erin Kelly (born 1981), American actress
 Erin McKean (born 1971), American lexicographer
 Erin Moran (1960–2017), American actress
 Erin Moriarty (born 1994), American actress
 Erin Morgenstern (born 1978), American writer
 Erin O'Connor (born 1978), British model
 Erin Phillips (born 1985), Australian former basketball player and Australian rules footballer
 Erin Pizzey (born 1939), author and founder of the first domestic violence shelter in the modern world
 Erin Richards (born 1986), Welsh actress
 Erin Sanders (born 1991), American actress
 Erinn Smart (born 1980), American fencer
 Erin Spanevello (1987–2008), Canadian fashion model
 Erin Wall (1975–2020), Canadian operatic soprano

Males
 Erin Henderson (born 1986), American football linebacker
 Erin Clark (born 1997), Samoa league footballer
 Erin Weir, Canadian Member of Parliament for the riding of Regina—Lewvan
 Erin Cossey (born 1971), New Zealand Maori rugby union player
 Erin O'Toole (born 1973), Canadian politician
 Erin Pinheiro (born 1997), Cape Verdean footballer

Fiction
 Dr Erin Mears, a character in the 2011 film, Contagion, played by Kate Winslet
 Erin, a character in 1986 American fantasy drama film The Boy Who Could Fly
 Erin, a character in The Simpsons episode "Summer of 4 Ft. 2", voiced by Christina Ricci
 Erin, protagonist of Nahoko Uehashi's light novel, manga, and anime series 獣の奏者エリン (Kemono no Sōja Erin)
 Erin Driscoll, a character in U.S. thriller 24
 Erin Esurance, formerly the Esurance mascot
 Erin Hannon, a character in U.S. sitcom The Office
 Erin Noble, a character in British television series Young Dracula
 Erin Quinn, protagonist of Northern Irish sitcom Derry Girls 
 Erin Silver, a character in American television franchise Beverly Hills, 90210
 Erin Strauss, the former BAU Section Chief from the U.S. drama series Criminal Minds
 Erin Ulmer, a character from Final Destination 3
 Erin Walton, a character from The Waltons
 Eirin Yagokoro, a character from Touhou Project

References

English feminine given names
Geographic history of Ireland
Given names
Irish feminine given names
Irish mythology